Maria Christina Thayer is an American actress and comedian. She first earned public recognition for her portrayal of Tammi Littlenut on the cult series Strangers with Candy in 1999. Thayer has also had supporting roles in the comedy films Hitch (2005), Accepted (2006), and Forgetting Sarah Marshall (2008).

She has appeared in numerous television series, including a lead role on the Adult Swim series Eagleheart (2011–2014), and a lead role as Abbey Logan on the comedy series Those Who Can't. She played the title role in the movie Night of the Living Deb.

Early life
Thayer was born in Portland, Oregon, and spent her early life in the small town of Boring, east of Portland, where her parents owned a bee farm. During her childhood, the family relocated to Minnesota, where she attended Apple Valley High School in Apple Valley, Minnesota, and was a member of the award-winning forensics program and the National Forensic League, as well as Homecoming Queen. She studied acting at The Juilliard School in New York.

Career
In 2005, Thayer appeared in Hitch with Will Smith and Eva Mendes.

In Forgetting Sarah Marshall, Thayer plays a woman on holiday with a new husband, played by Jack McBrayer. Thayer and McBrayer reunited on an episode of 30 Rock in which she portrays Kenneth Parcell's blind, shallow love interest. She also played Grace and Leo's daughter, Lila (at age 18), in the series finale of Will & Grace (2006). In 2009, she appeared in the film State of Play as Sonia Baker, the researcher and mistress of a congressman.

Thayer stars in the Adult Swim comedy series Eagleheart, which began airing on February 3, 2011 on Cartoon Network. She appeared as Tracey Bluth in the fourth season of Arrested Development in flashback scenes. In 2012, she was featured in the music video "Sensitive Man" by Nick Lowe.

In 2014, Thayer played the sudden wife of Forrest MacNeill (Andy Daly) on the Comedy Central show Review for the episode "Marry, Run, Party" of the first season.

Starting in 2015, she starred in the TruTV sitcom Those Who Can't as an incompetent teacher at a Denver high school, alongside Ben Roy, Adam Cayton-Holland and Andrew Orvedahl (The Grawlix).

Personal life
Thayer was previously engaged to actor David Harbour.

Filmography

Film

Television

Music videos

Stage

References

External links

 

1975 births
20th-century American actresses
21st-century American actresses
Actresses from Oregon
Actresses from Portland, Oregon
American film actresses
American stage actresses
American television actresses
American women comedians
Juilliard School alumni
Living people
People from Boring, Oregon
20th-century American comedians
21st-century American comedians
Apple Valley High School (Minnesota) alumni